Charlie Harrison may refer to:
 Charlie Harrison (basketball) (1949–2020), American college basketball coach for New Mexico and East Carolina
 Charlie Harrison (footballer, born 1861) (1861–?), English footballer for Bolton Wanderers
 Charlie Harrison (Gaelic footballer), footballer from County Sligo, Ireland
 Charlie Harrison (Manchester United footballer), English footballer for Manchester United
 Charlie Harrison, bassist for Poco, 1978–84

See also 
 Charles Harrison (disambiguation)